St Katherine's Church, Lincoln also known as "Southside" and "St Katherines Cathedral Church" is a Grade II-listed church in Lincoln, Lincolnshire, England. It is a former Methodist church in the Boultham and St Catherine's areas of the city. It was first opened in 1887 with the tower and spire being added later. During its use as a place of worship, it was dubbed "Lincoln's second cathedral'' (after the much older and larger cathedral in the city centre). 

The church was declared redundant in 1982 and was then reused for a DIY warehouse before being left vacated. Now it is in use for a community venue and commercial centre as "Southside".

References

External links
Genealogy wez site - summary page about Lincoln Churches

Lincoln
Lincoln
Lincoln
Churches in Lincoln, England
Lincoln